Brushcutter may refer to:
 A device usually mounted to a vehicle for forestry mulching
 Brushcutter (garden tool), a hand-held powered tool used for trimming weeds and other foliage